City of Damnation is a 2009 South Korean film directed by Kim Dong-won and is a remake of the 2002 Hong Kong film Infernal Affairs.

Plot
Jang Choon-dong is a traffic officer who aspires to become a homicide detective. After being noticed by his superiors, Choon-dong is assigned to go undercover to infiltrate a gangster network headed by Yang Kwang-seob. Meanwhile, Lee Joong-dae (Jung Woong-in), a member of Kwang-seob's gang, goes undercover himself by joining the police force. Joong-dae tries hard to gain favour with his squad leader and bureau director in an effort to expose Choon-dong's identity, but falls in love with a colleague, Cha Se-rin.

Cast
 Jung Joon-ho as Jang Choon-dong
 Jung Woong-in as Lee Joong-dae
 Jung Woon-taek as Moon Dong-sik, aka Dae Ga-ri
 Park Sang-min as Ssang-kal
 Kim Sang-joong as Gangster boss Yang Kwang-seob
 Han Go-eun as Police lieutenant Cha Se-rin
 Sunwoo Jae-duk as Squad leader Park Jong-ki
 Park Yong-gi as Bureau director Cheon Seong-ki
 Kim Dae-hee as Won Sam-eeh, aka Won Soong-eeh
 Kang Seong-pil as Yang Pal-eeh
 Kim Young-hoon as Chef camouflage worker

Release
City of Damnation was released in South Korea on 22 January 2009, and was the only Korean film to be released during the Lunar New Year holiday, traditionally a big season for domestic films. On its opening weekend it was ranked third at the box office with 249,720 admissions, and the film's disappointing performance was thought to illustrate a steady decline in the popularity of the gangster comedy genre with local audiences. As of 22 February, City of Damnation had received a total of 1,555,039 admissions nationwide, and as of 1 March had grossed a total of US$7,545,744.

See also
The Departed
Infernal Affairs

References

External links
  
 
 
 

2009 films
2000s Korean-language films
South Korean action comedy films
South Korean remakes of foreign films
Films directed by Kim Dong-won (1962)
CJ Entertainment films
2000s South Korean films